Monoembryony is the emergence of one and only one seedling from a seed. A seed giving two or more seedlings is polyembryonic. Some of the nuclear cells surrounding the embryo sac start dividing and protrude into the embryo sac and develop into embryos.

References

Plant reproduction
Embryology